John Stefanowicz (born September 20, 1991) is an American Greco-Roman wrestler. He is a two-time gold medalist at the Pan American Wrestling Championships.

Stefanowicz won the Olympic Trials at 87 kg, qualifying him for the 2020 Summer Olympics.  In the finals he beat Joe Rau in a controversial match. He competed in the men's 87 kg event at Olympics, finishing 12th overall.

Stefanowicz wrestled for the United States Marine Corps, becoming the first Marine member of the U.S. Olympic wrestling team since 1992.  He holds the rank of Staff Sergeant.

References

External links

1991 births
Living people
Place of birth missing (living people)
American male sport wrestlers
American military Olympians
Pan American Wrestling Championships medalists
Sportspeople from North Carolina
People from Jacksonville, North Carolina
Wrestlers at the 2020 Summer Olympics
United States Marine Corps non-commissioned officers
Olympic wrestlers of the United States
21st-century American people